Meraj Hamayun Khan (born 8 August 1945) is a Pakistani educationist, social worker and politician from Swabi District who is a member of the Khyber Pakhtunkhwa Assembly belonging to the Qaumi Watan Party. She is a committee chairperson and a member of various committees.

Political career
Meraj was elected as the member of the Khyber Pakhtunkhwa Assembly on the ticket of Qaumi Watan Party from Constituency WR-19 at the 2013 Pakistani general election.
She joined PML(N) on 23 September 2019 at a party workers' convention at Swabi.

Education and award
Meraj Hamayun Khan has degrees in MEd, BSc and MA. She was conferred Aizaz-e-Fazeelat for Education by the President of Pakistan in 2002.

References

1945 births
Living people
Pashtun women
Qaumi Watan Party politicians
Khyber Pakhtunkhwa MPAs 2013–2018
People from Swabi District